Jason Holliday (June 8, 1924 – June 15, 1998) (birth name: Aaron Payne) was an American hustler and nightclub performer. He is the star of Shirley Clarke's 1967 documentary Portrait of Jason.

Life
The facts surrounding Aaron Payne's life are unresolved. In Holliday's own words:

Payne said, "Jason Holliday was created in San Francisco, and San Francisco is a place to be created."

He was born in either Montgomery, Alabama, or Trenton, New Jersey. His parents, Fannie and Eugene, owned Payne's Restaurant in Trenton, but were from the South. Payne attended Rider Business College for one year before moving on to the Actors Workshop in Hollywood, where he studied with Charles Laughton. He then studied at the American Academy of Dramatic Arts in New York, along with Carl Lee, the man who introduced Payne to Shirley Clarke.

The details get even less clear after Portrait of Jason. Holliday recorded an LP of a comedy act which eventually came out in 2007.

Aaron Payne's obituary appeared in The Trentonian on July 31, 1998. He died in Flushing and was survived by two sisters, six nieces and two nephews, and was cremated at Oxford Hills Crematory in Chester, New York.

Portrait of Jason
A month before shooting, Holliday met Andy Warhol at a bar through Paul Morrissey. Warhol attempted to make a film starring Holliday and Edie Sedgwick, but it never materialized. Shirley Clarke went on to make Portrait of Jason.

In an interview with Jonas Mekas for his Village Voice column in 1967, Holliday said:

Richard Brody wrote of Holliday's performance:

The film critic Vito Russo wrote: "two hours with Jason Holliday is like a month in another country."

References

External links
 The Wisdom of Jason Holliday: 10 Quotes From Shirley Clarke's 'Portrait of Jason,' the Original Viral Star at Indiewire
 Peeling Away The Layers In A 'Portrait Of Jason' at NPR
 Portrait of Jason, the Spark that Burned Paris at Out

1924 births
1998 deaths
American male prostitutes
Gay entertainers
Gay male prostitutes
LGBT African Americans
20th-century American LGBT people